Charles Greene may refer to:
 Charles Ezra Greene (1842–1903), American civil engineer
 Charles Gordon Greene (1804–1886), American journalist
 Charles Greene (athlete) (1945–2022), American athlete
 Charles Sumner Greene (1868–1957), American architect
 Charles Warren Greene (1840–1920), American journalist and author
 Charles Wilson Greene (1866–1947), American professor of physiology and pharmacology

See also
 Charles Green (disambiguation)
 Charlie Greene (disambiguation)